Leonard Maxwell Isaacson (born 1925) is an American chemist and composer.

Isaacson collaborated with Lejaren Hiller on the computer-programmed acoustic composition, Illiac Suite (1957). At the time, both composers were professors at the University of Illinois at Urbana–Champaign, and used the university's room-size ILLIAC I.

Bibliography
Hiller, Lejaren A., and Leonard M. Issacson. (1959/1979). Experimental Music: Composition With an Electronic Computer. McGraw-Hill, New York. .

References

1925 births
Issacson
Issacson
American chemists
Living people
University of Illinois Urbana-Champaign faculty